Bani Ramón Lozano Núñez (born 1 May 1982 in Arenal) is a Honduran international footballer who plays for Platense in the Liga Nacional de Honduras.

His usual position is left back, but he is also capable of operating as a winger.

Club career 
Lozano was only 15 when he made his debut for Platense in 2002. Later in the year 2006, he was transferred to Nacional, with which he failed to secure a first-team place.

Return to Platense 
Lozano returned to Platense in January 2007. He scored 24 league goals for Platense during his six seasons with the club.

Olimpia 
On 16 May 2010, Lozano signed a three-year contract with Olimpia. On 8 August, he made his domestic league debut against Hispano with a 2–0 win.

Marathón
In June 2011 he joined Marathón. Marathón's coach Ramón Maradiaga however deemed him surplus to requirements in summer 2012, forcing Lozano to sit out the 2012 Apertura season without a club.

Platense again
At the end of 2012 he was presented as a new reinforcement at Platense.

International career
Lozano made his debut for Honduras in an August 2007 friendly match against El Salvador, and won a second cap five years later.

References

External links

  
 Profile - Diez

1982 births
Living people
People from Yoro Department
Association football defenders
Honduran footballers
Honduras international footballers
Platense F.C. players
Club Nacional de Football players
C.D. Olimpia players
C.D. Marathón players
Liga Nacional de Fútbol Profesional de Honduras players
Honduran expatriate footballers
Expatriate footballers in Uruguay